The Golden Hinde (launched 1973) is a full-size replica of the Golden Hind (launched 1577). She was built using traditional handicrafts at Appledore, in Devon. Like the original ship, she has circumnavigated the globe.

Construction

Golden Hinde was commissioned by Albert Elledge and Art Blum of San Francisco, designed by naval architect Loring Christian Norgaard and built by J Hinks & Son of Appledore. The keel was laid on 30 September 1971 and construction took two years. She was launched on 5 April 1973 by Diana, Countess of Devon.

Specifications:
Masts: 3
Sails 6, 5 square sails and lateen
Hull: Iroko planking on oak frames with an elm keel.
Hull dimensions:
Length:
Overall: 
Hull: 
Waterline: 
Breadth: 
Draft (max): 
Displacement: 
Beam: 
Height of mainmast: 
Sail area: 
Speed (sail): 
Steering: Drake used a pole attached to the rudder called a "whipstaff". For safety, a conventional wheel is used in the replica.
Capstan: used for hauling up the anchor, located in the armoury and gun deck
Crew complement: 80–85
Armaments: 22 guns
2 peteras (small guns) on the poop deck
2 peteras on the foredeck
2 falcons (long-range guns using two pound shot) in the forecastle
2 falcons in the stern
14 minions (guns using four pound shot) on the gun deck
Load: ca. 100–150 tons (100–150 tonnes)
Maximum crew complement: 95

Voyages

Golden Hinde sailed from Plymouth on her maiden voyage in late 1974, arriving on 8May 1975  in San Francisco, to commemorate Sir Francis Drake's claiming of New Albion, recognized as Drake's Cove near Point Reyes in California. Having completed the filming of the TV series Shogun the vessel lay moored in Taura Harbour, Yokohama for over six months. Starting in late 1979 she was sailed back to England via Hong Kong, Singapore, then across the Indian Ocean and through the Red Sea and Mediterranean in time to join the celebrations commemorating the 400th anniversary of Drake's triumphant return to England. Between 1981 and 1984, she was berthed in England and was established as an educational museum, but in 1984–1985 she sailed around the British Isles and then crossed the Atlantic to the Caribbean. In 1986, she passed through the Panama Canal to sail on to British Columbia for the World's Fair in Vancouver. In 1987, she began a tour of the US Pacific coast, visiting ports in the states of Washington, Oregon, and California. In 1988, she passed back through the Panama Canal to visit Texas. In 1989, she visited ports on the Gulf of Mexico. In 1990–1991 she entered a series of seaports on the east coast of the US, in 1992 returning home to tour the British Isles again.

Use in films
Golden Hinde has been featured in four films: Swashbuckler (1976), Shogun (1979), Drake's Venture (1980) and St Trinian's 2: The Legend of Fritton's Gold (2009). She also appeared briefly in the first episode of the  TV series Shaka Zulu (1986).

Use as a museum
Since 1996 she has been berthed at St Mary Overie Dock on Cathedral Street, in Bankside, Southwark, London, between Southwark Cathedral and Clink Street. She hosts visits from schools in which children can dress up as Tudor sailors and receive living history lessons about Elizabethan maritime history.

References

Bibliography
 Otmar Schäuffelen (trad. Casay SERVAIS), Chapman, Great sailing ships of the world, Hearst Books (New York), 2002, 420 p.. 
 The Golden Hinde, Norwich, Jarrold Publishing, 1973, 16 p..

External links

Golden Hinde museum

Galleons
Replica ships
Individual sailing vessels
Museums in the London Borough of Southwark
Transport museums in London
Museum ships in the United Kingdom
Maritime incidents in 1985
Museums on the River Thames